The Foul King is a 2000 South Korean comedy-drama film, written and directed by Kim Jee-woon. It was Kim's second feature-length film after The Quiet Family. Like the director's debut film, The Foul King also stars Song Kang-ho, this time as an incompetent bank clerk who takes up a career in professional wrestling, adopting the moniker "The Foul King" in the ring.

Plot
Im Dae-ho (Song Kang-ho) has been a huge fan of professional wrestling since his childhood.  In South Korea, a wrestler called Kim Il was a big star in the 1970s, but Dae-ho preferred a cheating fighter called Ultra Tiger Mask.  Years later, when his job at a bank isn't going well, Dae-ho decides to try professional wrestling himself.

Cast
 Song Kang-ho as Im Dae-ho
 Jang Jin-young as Jang Min-young
 Park Sang-myun as Tae Baek-san
 Kim Su-ro as Yoo Bi-ho
 Jang Hang-sun as Jang Gwan-jang
 Jung Woong-in as Choi Du-sik
 Shin Goo as Im Dae-ho's father

References

External links 
 
 
 
 Darcy Paquet's review at koreanfilm.org

2000 films
South Korean sports comedy-drama films
2000s sports comedy-drama films
Professional wrestling films
Films directed by Kim Jee-woon
Films with screenplays by Kim Dae-woo
Cinema Service films
2000s Korean-language films
2000 comedy films
2000 drama films
2000s South Korean films